Piet van Gammeren is a Dutch mixed martial artist. He competed in the Heavyweight division.

Mixed martial arts record

|-
| Loss
| align=center| 7-7-1
| Michailis Deligiannakis
| TKO
| FFG: Fight Night
| 
| align=center| 2
| align=center| 0:00
| Crete, Greece
| 
|-
| Loss
| align=center| 7-6-1
| Paul Cahoon
| KO (punch)
| 2H2H 3: Hotter Than Hot
| 
| align=center| 1
| align=center| 1:24
| Rotterdam, South Holland, Netherlands
| 
|-
| Loss
| align=center| 7-5-1
| Edmunds Kirsis
| Disqualification
| BOA 3: Battle of Arnhem 3
| 
| align=center| 1
| align=center| 0:00
| Arnhem, Gelderland, Netherlands
| 
|-
| Win
| align=center| 7-4-1
| Herman Renting
| Decision (unanimous)
| Rings Holland: Heroes Live Forever
| 
| align=center| 2
| align=center| 5:00
| Utrecht, Netherlands
| 
|-
| Win
| align=center| 6-4-1
| Peter Verschuren
| Decision (unanimous)
| Rings Holland: The Kings of the Magic Ring
| 
| align=center| 3
| align=center| 3:00
| Utrecht, Netherlands
| 
|-
| Loss
| align=center| 5-4-1
| Can Sahinbas
| TKO (cut)
| IMA: Back to the Roots
| 
| align=center| 0
| align=center| 0:00
| Hoofddorp, North Holland, Netherlands
| 
|-
| Loss
| align=center| 5-3-1
| Michael Tielrooy
| KO
| IMA: Mix Fight Gala
| 
| align=center| 0
| align=center| 0:00
| Landsmeer, North Holland, Netherlands
| 
|-
| Draw
| align=center| 5-2-1
| Stef Stricker
| Draw
| FFH: Free Fight Gala
| 
| align=center| 0
| align=center| 0:00
| Beverwijk, North Holland, Netherlands
| 
|-
| Loss
| align=center| 5-2
| Dave van der Veen
| TKO (cut)
| Rings Holland: The Thialf Explosion
| 
| align=center| 0
| align=center| 0:00
|  Heerenveen, Friesland, Netherlands
| 
|-
| Win
| align=center| 5-1
| Ferry van de Wal
| Decision (1-0 points)
| IMA: KO Power Tournament
| 
| align=center| 1
| align=center| 10:00
| Amsterdam, North Holland, Netherlands
| 
|-
| Loss
| align=center| 4-1
| Danielius Razmus
| TKO (submission to strikes)
| M-1 MFC: European Championship 1998
| 
| align=center| 1
| align=center| 0:00
| Saint Petersburg, Russia
| 
|-
| Win
| align=center| 4-0
| Sergei Akinin
| Submission (smother)
| M-1 MFC: European Championship 1998
| 
| align=center| 1
| align=center| 0:00
| Saint Petersburg, Russia
| 
|-
| Win
| align=center| 3-0
| Jerry Kalia
| TKO (knee injury)
| Rings Holland: The King of Rings
| 
| align=center| 2
| align=center| 0:19
| North Holland, Netherlands
| 
|-
| Win
| align=center| 2-0
| Gerard Benschop
| N/A
| FFH: Free Fight Gala
| 
| align=center| 0
| align=center| 0:00
| Beverwijk, North Holland, Netherlands
| 
|-
| Win
| align=center| 1-0
| Broede van Deutekom
| N/A
| Gym Alkmaar: Fight Gala
| 
| align=center| 0
| align=center| 0:00
| Bergen, North Holland, Netherlands
|

See also
List of male mixed martial artists

References

Dutch male mixed martial artists
Heavyweight mixed martial artists
Living people
Place of birth missing (living people)
Year of birth missing (living people)